My Bones Will Keep is a 1962 mystery detective novel by the British writer Gladys Mitchell. It is the thirty fifth in the long-running series of books featuring Mitchell's best known character, the psychoanalyst and amateur detective Mrs Bradley.

Synopsis
While accompanying her friend Dame Beatrice Bradley to a conference in Scotland, her assistant Laura becomes dragged into a mystery that intrigues her.

References

Bibliography
 Craig, Patricia & Cadogan, Mary. The Lady Investigates: Women Detectives and Spies in Fiction. Orion Publishing Group 1981.
 Reilly, John M. Twentieth Century Crime & Mystery Writers. Springer, 2015.

1962 British novels
Novels by Gladys Mitchell
British crime novels
British mystery novels
British thriller novels
Novels set in Scotland
British detective novels
Michael Joseph books